Odvar Omland (born 18 July 1923) is a Norwegian politician for the Christian Democratic Party.

He served as a deputy representative to the Norwegian Parliament from Akershus during the terms 1977–1981.

On the local level he has been a member of Asker municipal council.

References

1923 births
Living people
Deputy members of the Storting
Christian Democratic Party (Norway) politicians
Asker politicians
Place of birth missing (living people)